NGC 1931 is an emission and reflection nebula in the constellation Auriga. The nebula has been referred to as a "miniature version of the Orion Nebula", as it shares some of the same characteristics. It is a mixed emission-reflection nebula, and contains a smaller version of the Trapezium in its hot young star cluster centered in the emission nebula. The entire cluster/nebula complex is only about 3 arcmin in size. The distance from earth is estimated at about 7000 light years.

The nebula is Sharpless catalog Sh 2-237.

References

External links

 NGC 1931 @ Wikisky
 NGC 1931 @ SEDS NGC objects pages
 Sharpless 237 

Emission nebulae
Reflection nebulae
Auriga (constellation)
1931
Sharpless objects
Star-forming regions